David Honey (born 30 November 1966 from Droitwich Spa) is an English professional darts player, who played in Professional Darts Corporation events.

Career
Honey played in the 2006 PDC World Darts Championship, but lost in the last 64 to Adrian Lewis of England.

World Championship performances results

PDC
 2006: Last 64: (lost to Adrian Lewis 0–3)

References

External links

1966 births
Living people
English darts players
Professional Darts Corporation former tour card holders